Thomas Oliver Morgan (born 20 January 1941) is a retired bishop of the Anglican Church of Canada.

Morgan was educated at the University of Saskatchewan and trained for the priesthood at King's College London and Tyndale Hall, Bristol. He began his ordained ministry as a curate at the Church of the Saviour, Blackburn, after which he was the incumbent of Porcupine Plain, Saskatchewan. After being rector of Kinistino he became Archdeacon of Indian Missions in the Diocese of Saskatchewan and then the diocesan Bishop of Saskatchewan in 1985. He was translated to be the Bishop of Saskatoon in 1993 and then became the Archbishop of Saskatoon and Metropolitan of the Ecclesiastical Province of Rupert's Land in 2000, resigning both positions in 2003.

References

1941 births
University of Saskatchewan alumni
Alumni of the Theological Department of King's College London
Anglican bishops of Saskatchewan
Anglican bishops of Saskatoon
20th-century Anglican Church of Canada bishops
21st-century Anglican Church of Canada bishops
Metropolitans of Rupert's Land
21st-century Anglican archbishops
Living people